María Caridad Colón Rueñes-Salazar (born March 25, 1958 in Baracoa) is a former javelin thrower from Cuba who won the gold medal at the 1980 Summer Olympics, setting a new record.

She lit the flame at the 1982 Central American and Caribbean Games.

In 2020, Rueñes became a member of the International Olympic Committee (IOC).

International competitions

1Representing the Americas

References

External links
 
 
 

1958 births
Living people
People from Baracoa
Cuban female javelin throwers
Olympic athletes of Cuba
Olympic gold medalists for Cuba
Olympic gold medalists in athletics (track and field)
Athletes (track and field) at the 1980 Summer Olympics
Athletes (track and field) at the 1992 Summer Olympics
Medalists at the 1980 Summer Olympics
Pan American Games gold medalists for Cuba
Pan American Games medalists in athletics (track and field)
Athletes (track and field) at the 1979 Pan American Games
Athletes (track and field) at the 1983 Pan American Games
Athletes (track and field) at the 1987 Pan American Games
Central American and Caribbean Games gold medalists for Cuba
Central American and Caribbean Games silver medalists for Cuba
Competitors at the 1978 Central American and Caribbean Games
Competitors at the 1982 Central American and Caribbean Games
Competitors at the 1986 Central American and Caribbean Games
Competitors at the 1990 Central American and Caribbean Games
Universiade medalists in athletics (track and field)
World Athletics Championships athletes for Cuba
Universiade bronze medalists for Cuba
International Olympic Committee members
Central American and Caribbean Games medalists in athletics
Medalists at the 1985 Summer Universiade
Medalists at the 1979 Pan American Games
Medalists at the 1983 Pan American Games
Medalists at the 1987 Pan American Games
Friendship Games medalists in athletics
20th-century Cuban women
20th-century Cuban people